A thorp is a hamlet or village.

Thorp or THORP may also refer to:

Places

United Kingdom
 Thorp, former hamlet, now within Royton, Greater Manchester
 Thorp Arch, West Yorkshire, a small village and civil parish near Wetherby
 Thorp Perrow Arboretum, North Yorkshire
 Thorp Academy

United States
 Thorp, Michigan, ghost town
 Thorp, Washington
 Thorp, Wisconsin, a city
 Thorp, Clark County, Wisconsin, a town
 Thorp Branch

Antarctica
 Thorp Ridges

People
 Angie Thorp
 Ash Thorp
 Bert D. Thorp (1869–1937), American politician
 Callum Thorp (born 1975), Australian professional cricketer
 Carl Thorp
 Charles Thorp (1784–1862), English churchman, Archdeacon of Durham and first warden of the University of Durham
 David Thorp
 Don Thorp (born 1962), former professional American football player
 Edward O. Thorp (born 1932), American mathematics professor, author, hedge fund manager and blackjack player
 Eline Thorp
 Gil Thorp, fictional protagonist of eponymous American sports-oriented comic strip
 Hamilton Thorp
 Herman Thorp
 Holden Thorp (born 1964), American chemist, inventor, musician, professor, and entrepreneur
 James Thorp (1937–2018), American electrical engineer
 Jer Thorp
 John Thorp (1912–1992), American aeronautical engineer and light aircraft designer
 John Thorp (physician) (born 1950s), American obstetrician-gynecologist
 Joseph G. Thorp
 Lin Thorp (born 1953), Australian politician
 Linton Thorp
 Mandana Coleman Thorp (1843-1916), American Civil War nurse, singer, patriot; public official
 Margaret Farrand Thorp
 Margaret Thorp
 Marius Thorp (born 1988), Norwegian professional golfer
 Mary Tucker Thorp
 Mitch Thorp (born 1988), Australian rules football player
 N. Howard Thorp
 Nicola Thorp
 Paul Thorp (born 1964), English motorcycle speedway rider
 Philip Thorp (1911–2006), English cricketer
 Prescott Holden Thorp (1887–1981), American stamp dealer
 Richard Thorp (1932–2013), English actor
 Robert Thorp, several people
 Roderick Thorp (1936–1999), American novelist
Samuel Thorp (1760s–1838), English clockmaker
 Sir John Kingsmill Thorp, governor of Seychelles and Saint Lucia
 Sir Thomas Thorp (1925–2018), retired New Zealand judge
 Thomas Thorp (scientific instrument manufacturer) (1850–1914), English manufacturer
 Tom Thorp (died 1942), American football player and coach, and sports writer
 Vic Thorp (1890–1941), Australian rules footballer
 Will Thorp (born 1977), English actor
 Willard Thorp (1899–1992), American economist and academic

Other uses
 Thermal Oxide Reprocessing Plant, THORP, a nuclear fuel reprocessing plant
 Thorp Records
 Thorp T-18 and other aircraft designed by John Thorp

See also
 Francis-Jones Morehen Thorp
 Peddle Thorp
 Thorpe (disambiguation)
Dorf (disambiguation)
Dorp (disambiguation)